James Cowles Prichard, FRS (11 February 1786 – 23 December 1848) was a British physician and ethnologist with broad interests in physical anthropology and psychiatry. His influential Researches into the Physical History of Mankind touched upon the subject of evolution. From 1845, Prichard served as a Medical Commissioner in Lunacy.  He also introduced the term "senile dementia".

Life 
Prichard was born in Ross-on-Wye, Herefordshire. His parents Thomas and Mary Prichard were Quakers: his mother was Welsh, and his father was of an English family who had emigrated to Pennsylvania . Within a few years of his birth in Ross, Prichard's parents moved to Bristol, where his father now worked in the Quaker ironworks of Harford, Partridge and Cowles. Upon his father's retirement in 1800 he returned to Ross. As a child Prichard was educated mainly at home by tutors and his father, in a range of subjects, including modern languages and general literature.

Rejecting his father's wish that he should join the ironworks, Prichard decided upon a medical career. Here he faced the difficulty that as a Quaker he could not become a member of the Royal College of Physicians. Therefore, he started on apprenticeships that led to the ranks of apothecaries and surgeons, first studying under the Quaker obstetrician Dr Thomas Pole of Bristol. Apprenticeships followed to other Quaker physicians, and to St Thomas' Hospital in London. In 1805, he entered medical school at Edinburgh University, where his religious affiliation was no bar. Also, the Scottish medical schools were held in esteem, having contributed greatly to the Enlightenment of the previous century.

He took his M.D. at Edinburgh, his doctoral thesis of 1808 being his first attempt at the great question of his life: the origin of human varieties and races. Later, he read for a year at Trinity College, Cambridge, after which came a significant personal event: he left the Society of Friends to join the established Church of England. He next moved to St John's College, Oxford, afterwards entering as a gentleman commoner at Trinity College, Oxford, but taking no degree in either university.

In 1810 Prichard settled at Bristol as a physician, eventually attaining an established position at the Bristol Infirmary (BRI) in 1816. Whilst working at the BRI, Prichard lived in the Red Lodge.  This was also where he wrote Researches into the Physical History of Man.

In 1845 he was made one of the three medical Commissioners in Lunacy, having previously been one of the Metropolitan Commissioners, and moved to London. He died there three years later of rheumatic fever. At the time of his death he was president of the Ethnological Society and a Fellow of the Royal Society.

Work 
In 1813 he published his Researches into the Physical History of Man, in two volumes, on essentially the same themes as his dissertation in 1808. The book grew until the third edition of 1836-1847 occupied five volumes. The second to the fourth editions were published under the title Researches into the Physical History of Mankind. The fourth edition was also in five volumes.

The central conclusion of the work is the unity of the human species, which has been acted upon by causes which have since divided it into permanent varieties or races. The work is dedicated to Johann Friedrich Blumenbach, whose five races of man are adopted. Prichard differed from Blumenbach and other predecessors by the principle that people should be studied by combining all available characters.

Evolution 
Three British men, all medically qualified and publishing between 1813 and 1819, William Lawrence, William Charles Wells and Prichard, addressed issues relevant to human evolution. All tackled the question of variation and race in humans; all agreed that these differences were heritable, but only Wells approached the idea of natural selection as a cause.

Science historian Conway Zirkle has described Prichard as an evolutionary thinker who came very close "to explaining the origin of new forms through the operation of natural selection although he never actually stated the proposition in so many words."

Prichard indicated Africa (indirectly) as the place of human origin, in this summary passage:

"On the whole there are many reasons which lead us to the conclusion that the primitive stock of men were probably Negroes, and I know of no argument to be set on the other side."

This opinion was omitted in later editions. The second edition includes more developed evolutionary ideas.

Anthropology 
Prichard was influential in the early days of ethnology and anthropology. He stated that the Celtic languages are allied by language with the Slavonian, German and Pelasgian (Greek and Latin), thus forming a fourth European branch of Indo-European languages. His treatise containing Celtic compared with Sanskrit words appeared in 1831 under the title Eastern Origin of the Celtic Nations. An essay by Adolphe Pictet, which made its author's reputation, was published independently of the earlier investigations of Prichard.

In 1843 Prichard published his Natural History of Man, in which he reiterated his belief in the specific unity of man, pointing out that the same inward and mental nature can be recognized in all the races. Prichard was an early member of the Aborigines' Protection Society.

Psychiatry 
In medicine, he specialised in what is now psychiatry. In 1822 he published A Treatise on Diseases of the Nervous System (pt. I), and in 1835 a Treatise on Insanity and Other Disorders Affecting the Mind, in which he advanced the theory of the existence of a distinct mental illness called moral insanity. Prichard's work was also the first definition of senile dementia in the English language. Augstein has suggested that these works were aimed at the prevalent materialist theories of mind, phrenology and craniology. She has also suggested that Prichard was influenced by the somatic school of German Romantic psychiatric thought, in particular Christian Friedrich Nasse, and (eclectically) Johann Christian August Heinroth; this in addition to an acknowledged debt to Jean-Étienne Dominique Esquirol.

In 1842, following up on moral insanity, he published On the Different Forms of Insanity in Relation to Jurisprudence, designed for the use of persons concerned in legal questions regarding unsoundness of mind.

Other works 
Among his other works were:
1819: Analysis of Egyptian Mythology
1829: A Review of the Doctrine of a Vital Principle
1831: On the Treatment of Hemiplegia
1839: On the Extinction of some Varieties of the Human Race

Family
He married Anne Maria Estlin, daughter of John Prior Estlin and sister of John Bishop Estlin. They had ten children, eight of whom survived infancy, including Augustin Prichard (b. 1818, d. 1898), Constantine Estlin Prichard (b.1820), Theodore Joseph Prichard (b.1821), Illtiodus Thomas Prichard (b. 1825), Edith Prichard (b. 1829) and Albert Herman Prichard (b.1831).

Archives
Documents including medical certificates relating to James Cowles Prichard and his second son, Augustin Prichard, are held at Bristol Archives (Ref. 16082) (online catalogue).  Records relating to James Cowles Prichard can also be found at the Wellcome Library and the Royal Geographical Society.

References

Attribution

Sources 

Augstein, Hannah Franziska. James Cowles Prichard's Anthropology: remaking the science of Man in early nineteenth-century Britain. Amsterdam: Rodopi, 1999. ;  (pbk)
Sera-Shriar, Efram, The Making of British Anthropology, 1813-1871, London: Pickering and Chatto, 2013, pp. 21–52.
Memoir by Dr Thomas Hodgkin (1798-1866) in Journal of the Ethnological Society (1849).
Memoir by John Addington Symonds, Journal of the Ethnological Society (1850).
 Prichard and Symonds in Special Relation to Mental Science, by Daniel Hack Tuke (1891).
 Stocking, George W. Jr 1973. "From chronology to ethnology: James Cowles Prichard and British Anthropology 1800–1850". Introduction to the reprint of Researches into the Physical History of Man, 1st ed 1813. Chicago, 1973.
 Symonds, John Addington 1871. "On the life, writings and character of the late James Cowles Prichard". In Miscellanies ... of Symonds, edited by his son, London: Macmillan.

External links 
 Wortks at Hathi Trust

 

1786 births
1848 deaths
People from Ross-on-Wye
Alumni of the University of Edinburgh
English philologists
English anthropologists
English people of Welsh descent
British ethnologists
19th-century British medical doctors
Fellows of the Royal Society
Fellows of the Ethnological Society of London
History of mental health in the United Kingdom
Medical doctors from Bristol
Proto-evolutionary biologists
Commissioners in Lunacy